Coldwater Lake State Park is an undeveloped public recreation area occupying  on the south shore of Coldwater Lake,  south of the city of Coldwater in Branch County, Michigan. Money from the Natural Resources Trust Funds was used to create the state park in 1988. Two small, unpaved parking areas offer walk-in access for hunters and fishermen. A general management plan for the park was adopted by the Michigan State Parks Advisory Committee in 2015.

References

External links
Coldwater Lake State Park Michigan Department of Natural Resources
Coldwater Lake State Park Map Michigan Department of Natural Resources

State parks of Michigan
Protected areas of Branch County, Michigan
Protected areas established in 1987
1987 establishments in Michigan
IUCN Category III